The 1902 VMI Keydets football team represented the Virginia Military Institute (VMI) in their 12th season of organized football. VMI went 3–3–1 in what would be Sam Walker last season as VMI head coach.

Schedule

References

VMI
VMI Keydets football seasons
VMI Keydets football